Bombs on Monte Carlo is a 1960 German comedy film directed by Georg Jacoby and starring Eddie Constantine, Marion Michael and Gunther Philipp. The film was based on a novel by Fritz Reck-Malleczewen which had already between adapted as a film in 1931 as Bombs on Monte Carlo.

Location shooting took place in Monaco, Nice and at the Schleissheim Palace in Munich. The film's sets were designed by the art directors Ernst H. Albrecht and Niko Matul.

Cast
Eddie Constantine as Captain Eddie Cronen
Marion Michael as Princess Marina
Gunther Philipp as Dr. Swaart
Gunnar Möller as Burg
Barbara Laage as Olga
Dominique Wilms as Giuletta
Denise Grey as Contesse Tamm
Albert Préjean as ward
Viktor de Kowa as minister

References

External links

West German films
Films directed by Georg Jacoby
1960 musical comedy films
German musical comedy films
Films shot in Monaco
Films set in Monaco
Seafaring films
Films set in the Mediterranean Sea
Remakes of German films
Films based on German novels
1960s German-language films
1960s German films